The women's 500 metres speed skating competition of the 2014 Sochi Olympics was held at Adler Arena Skating Center on 11 February 2014.

The reigning 2014 World Sprint Speed Skating Champion Yu Jing did not start due to reoccurrence of an old waist injury.

Qualification
A total of thirty-six speed skaters could qualify for this distance, with a maximum of four skaters per country. The top 20 of the 2013–14 ISU Speed Skating World Cup – Women's 500 metres standings after the fourth World Cup race in Berlin secured a spot for their country. Then the additional 16 spots were awarded based on a time ranking of all times skated in the World Cup and the 2014 World Sprint Speed Skating Championships. A reserve list was also made.

Records
Prior to this competition, the existing world and Olympic records were as follows.

500 meters (1 race)

500 meters x 2 (2 races)

At the 2013 World Single Distance Speed Skating Championships the track records were set by Lee Sang-hwa at 37.65 (single race) and 75.347 (combination).

The following records were set during this competition.

OR = Olympic record, TR = track record

Results
The races were held at 16:45 and 18:34. Lee Sang-hwa became the third woman to win back-to-back golds, having previously won the distance at the 2010 Olympics, and the first Korean woman to do so.

On 24 November 2017, silver medalist from Russia Olga Fatkulina was disqualified for a doping violation. On 1 February 2018, her results were restored as a result of the successful appeal.

OR = Olympic record, TR = track record, DQ = disqualified

References

Women's speed skating at the 2014 Winter Olympics